ATP-dependent Clp protease ATP-binding subunit clpX-like, mitochondrial is an enzyme that in humans is encoded by the CLPX gene. This protein is a member of the family of AAA Proteins (AAA+ ATPase) and is to form the protein complex of Clp protease (Endopeptidase Clp).

Structure

Protein Structure
The knowledge of human ClpX protein are majorly based on the investigations on E. coli protein.  The monomer of ClpX protein in E. coli contains a N-terminal domain and a AAA+ module which consists of a large and a small AAA+ domain.

Complex Assembly
During protease Clp complex assembly, the ClpX subunits form a hexameric ring structure. According to the orientation of ClpX subunits within the ring structure, these subunits can be categorized into two classes: "loadable" subunit (L subunit) and "unloadable" subunit (U subunit). In L subunit, the large and small AAA+ domain form a cleft for nucleotide ATP or ADP binding. However, the large and small AAA+ domains in U subunit rotate ~ 80°, which prevents nucleotide binding. The L and U subunits form a "L-L-U-L-L-U" pattern when they assemble into a hexameric ring, which has the maximum capacity to bind four ATP or ADP.   Electro-microscopy (EM) studies showed that ClpX ring structures stack coaxially on either one side or both side of ClpP tetradecamer complex to form ClpXP protease complexes. ATP binding can stabilize the association between ClpX and ClpP ring structures.

In Mycobacteria, the ClpXP protease is composed of the ATPase component (ClpX) and two ClpP proteins (ClpP1 and ClpP2). Interestingly, in contrast to the E. coli complex, in which the ATPase component is known to bind to either face of the barrel-shaped peptidase component, in Mycobacteria the ATPase component (ClpX) docks in an asymmetric manner, only binding to a one face of the ClpP1P2 complex - i.e. ClpP2

Function 
ClpX is an ATP-dependent chaperone that can recognize protein substrates by binding to protein degradation tags. These tags can be short unstructured peptide sequences (e.g., ssrA-tag in E coli). As an essential component of ClpP protease complex, ClpX recruits degradable substrates and unfolds their tertiary structure, which requires energy provided by ATP hydrolysis. Subsequently, these ClpX Chaperones transfer protein substrates into the proteolytic chamber formed by ClpP tetradecamer.

Clinical Significance
In mammals, ClpXP protease is a pivotal contributor to mitochondrial protein quality control. A compromised ClpXP function usually leads to the accumulation of damaged proteins and mitochondrial dysfunctions, which believes to be potential causes for neurodegenerative diseases and aging.

References 

Proteases
EC 3.4